Palestro is a town and commune in Italy, in the province of Pavia.

Palestro may also refer to:
Palestro (Milan Metro), a station on the Line 1 of Milan Metro
Palestro-class torpedo boat
Palestro-class ironclad floating battery

Lakhdaria, formerly Palestro, a town in northern Algeria, in the Bouira Province

See also
Battle of Palestro
Ambush of Palestro